Nikolai Bardin is a Russian professional ice hockey winger. He currently plays with Yugra Khanty-Mansiysk of the Kontinental Hockey League (KHL). Before joining his current team, Bardin played five seasons with HC Severstal of the KHL.

Career statistics

References

External links

External links

Living people
1976 births
Russian ice hockey left wingers
HC Neftekhimik Nizhnekamsk players
HC Yugra players
Molot-Prikamye Perm players
Severstal Cherepovets players
Sportspeople from Perm, Russia